Personne is a surname which may refer too:

Carl Personne (1888–1976), Swedish fencer
Jacques Personne (1816–1880), French pharmacologist and chemist
Nils Personne (1918–2013), Swedish Air Force lieutenant general
Pascale Fontenel-Personne (born 1962), French politician
Paul Personne (born 1949), French blues singer and guitarist

Surnames